For other people, see Louis Bush (disambiguation)

Lewis K. Bush (born 1988) is a British photographer, writer, curator and educator. He aims "to draw attention to forms of invisible power that operate in the world", believing that "power is always problematic" because it is inherently "arbitrary and untransparent".

Bush's The Memory of History (2012), is about Europe's forgetfulness of its unresolved past and that past's re-emergence, as evidenced in the time of the European debt crisis; The Camera Obscured (2012) is about the absurdity of security guards preventing people from photographing buildings; Metropole (2015) is "an architectural critique on the changing face of London"; A Model Continent (2016) is about the current state of the European Union and about its history being reduced to a tourist spectacle; War Primer 3 (2013) is a reworking of Broomberg and Chanarin's book War Primer 2; and Shadows of the State (2018) is about numbers stations. All are self-published apart from Shadows of the State and the 2018 version of Metropole. The Memory of History and Metropole have been shown in solo exhibitions in London.

From 2011 to 2016 he wrote and edited a blog about photography, Disphotic.

Life and work
Bush was born in 1988 in London. He studied history at the University of Warwick and gained a master's degree in documentary photography from London College of Communication (LCC). He lectures on photojournalism and documentary photography at LCC.

From 2011 to 2016 he wrote and edited a blog about photography, Disphotic. Its tagline was "Exploring photography and it's [sic] intersections with journalism, art, and history."

In 2012, for The Memory of History (2012), Bush travelled through ten European Union countries to examine the effects of the European debt crisis, in the context of Europe's turbulent history of crises that are forgotten, only later to resurface. Bush intends to show that process happening again, where unresolved history is reappearing "with the economic pain of the present", using photographs that show "connections between history and the present".

For The Camera Obscured (2012) he set up a camera obscura outside sensitive sites around London and used it to draw them until challenged by security guards. Bush "attempted to engage these personnel in a discussion about art history, highlighting the blurred boundaries between images made by mechanical means and those drawn by hand, and by doing so demonstrating the absurdity of their objections." The work is also about "the intersections of art and photography, and the question of where the balance lies between individual rights and collective security."

His War Primer 3 (2013 and 2018) is a reworking of Broomberg and Chanarin's War Primer 2 (2011), itself an appropriation of Bertolt Brecht's pacifist book War Primer (1955). Brecht's book was a "critique of the relationship between war and photography", using photographs and poems; Bush's ebook, in critiquing Broomberg and Chanarin's book, is about "inequality, labour and capital." The title recalls a primer, a first textbook for teaching of reading.

His Metropole (2015) zine is "an architectural critique on the changing face of London", "intended to highlight how large swathes of the city are being developed so quickly that they have become unrecognisable – a move he believes is aggressively wiping out London's history and diversity."

His Shadows of the State (2018) is a book about numbers stations, that "seeks to visualise, locate and expose many of these stations". It is about the "line of reasoning [. . . ] that the only way to defend democracy is by having something inherently undemocratic at its core." Rather than taking photographs, Bush collated write-ups, publicly available satellite imagery, spectrograms and maps.

During the UK's first COVID-19 pandemic lockdown, Bush forensically exposed and photographed fingerprints present on goods he bought in shops and online. The work is about the potential for contamination of consumers with SARS-CoV-2. It is also about exposing the presence of the usually hidden labourers, vulnerable because of working in distribution at a time of social distancing.

Publications

Publications by Bush
The Memory of History. Self-published, 2012. With essays by Bush.
Boxed edition. Self-published, 2012. 56 prints and an essay, "The History of Memory", in 12 separate short chapters. Edition of 27 copies.
Updated second edition. Self-published, 2014. Restructured and with updated text, and with a new introduction by Bush.
The Camera Obscured. Self-published, 2012. With texts by Bush.
War Primer 3.
Ebook. Self-published, 2013.
Facsimile edition. Self-published, 2018.
Shadows of the State. Berlin: Brave, 2018. .
Metropole. Overlapse, 2018. .

Smaller publications by Bush
Metropole. Self-published, 2015. A zine.
Second printing. Self-published, 2015.
A Model Continent. Self-published, 2016. A postcard book.

Publication with contribution by Bush
Flash Forward 2017: Emerging Photographers from Canada, the United Kingdom & the United States. Toronto: Magenta Foundation, 2017. . With a foreword by Dan Gaba.

Exhibitions

Solo exhibitions
The Memory of History, 12 Star Gallery, Europe House, London, 2014.
Metropole, London Arts Board, London, 2015.
Metropole, Sir John Cass School of Art, Architecture and Design, London Metropolitan University, London, 2015–2016.
City of Dust, Westminster Reference Library, London, 2016.
Trading Zones, The Old Police Station, Saint Helier, Jersey, September 2018. Work resulting from the Archisle photographer in residence at the Société Jersiaise on the Channel Island of Jersey, exploring different aspects of finance.

Exhibitions curated by Bush
Media & Myth, Format Festival, Derby, UK, 2015.
Magna Errata, The Alternative Magna Carta Festival, Clerkenwell, London, 2015.
Very Now, London College of Communication, London, 2016.
Images of Power, Seen Fifteen Gallery, Peckham, London, 2016. Curated by Bush and Mark Duffy.
Incomplete Images, Light Eye Mind, London, 2017. Curated by Bush and Monica Alcazar-Duarte. Work by Tomás Peña, Elena Kollatou and Leonidas Toumpanos, Aram Karim, Damon Amb, and Rahman Hassani.
It's Gonna be Great, Copeland Gallery, Peckham, London, 2017. Curated by Bush and Duffy.

Awards
2017: 1 of 92 winners, Magenta Foundation Flash Forward Award, Toronto, Canada
2018: International Photographer in Residence, Archisle Project, Société Jersiaise Photographic Archive, Jersey

Notes

References

External links

Looking out over London from Elephant and Castle - How highrises took over London  – photographs and writing on Metropole by Bush in The Daily Telegraph

1988 births
Living people
Photographers from London
Alumni of the University of Warwick
British curators
Photography curators
Photography academics
Academics of the University of the Arts London
20th-century British photographers